Vahidi is a surname which is derived from the Arabic word واحدی (Wahidi or Vahidi). Also spelled Vahidy and Wahidy. Notable people with the surname include:

Ahmad Vahidi (born 1958), Iranian politician and military commander
Behrouz Vahidi Azar  (born 1952), Iranian violin teacher 
Iraj Vahidi (1927–2022), Iranian engineer and politician

Surnames of Arabic origin